"I for You" is the eleventh single by Japanese rock band Luna Sea, released on July 1, 1998. It reached number 2 on the Oricon Singles Chart and was the 49th best-selling single of the year. It was the third and last in a serial release after the band's hibernation from 1997 to early 1998.

Overview
Original scores for "I for You" were composed by Sugizo as an orchestrated version; although it was first written around 1993, it had not been considered for recording until later, when an opportunity appeared for creating a theme song for a TV drama. The final version of the song was furnished with revisions by Ryuichi. Sugizo's mother is featured playing the cello.

During the recording of "I for You", guitarist hide of X Japan, who was a close friend with members of the band, died. Some of the lyrics are described as a tribute to him by the members. It was used as the theme song for the Japanese TV drama , which was also aired overseas in Asia and helped to popularize the band internationally, leading to their First Asian Tour the following year.

The B-side "With" was originally composed by Inoran around 1994. Clock ticking appears near the end of the song, connecting it to the first track of Shine, "Time Has Come".

Track listing
"I for You" - 5:30
"With" - 5:57

Reception
"I for You" reached number 2 on the Oricon Singles Chart, charted for 16 weeks, and was certified Platinum by the RIAJ in July 1998 for sales over 400,000. It went on to become the 49th best-selling single of the year with 481,390 copies sold.

Cover versions
Ryuichi recorded his own version of "I for You" for his 2006 cover album, Evergreen. It was also covered by Juichi Morishige of Ziggy for 2007's Luna Sea Memorial Cover Album -Re:birth-. In 2012, the song was covered by both Mr. Big singer Eric Martin and Megamasso singer Inzargi for their respective cover albums.

References

Luna Sea songs
Rock ballads
Japanese television drama theme songs
1998 singles